The Irish Albums Chart ranks the best-performing albums in Ireland, as compiled by the Official Charts Company on behalf of the Irish Recorded Music Association.

Number-one artists

See also
 List of number-one singles of 2019 (Ireland)

References

Number-one albums
Ireland
2019